Van der Ham or Van den Ham is a Dutch toponymic surname meaning "from the ham". The Dutch word ham (as well as hem) only survives in place names and used to refer to alluvial land in a curve of a river. Several places exist with the name Ham or Den Ham so that the surname, especially in the form Van Ham,  could refer to a specific location. Notable people with the surname include:

Van der Ham
Boris van der Ham (born 1973), Dutch actor and politician
Joanna Vanderham (born 1991), Scottish actress
Katarina Van Derham (born 1975), Slovak-American model, actress, and publisher 
Michael van der Ham (born 1985), Dutch womenswear designer
Van den Ham
Marieke van den Ham (born 1983), Dutch water polo player
Michael van den Ham (born 1992), Canadian cyclo-cross cyclist
Van Ham
Herman van Ham (1931–2012), Dutch head chef
Meindert van Ham (also Meindert van den Hamm; c.1470– aft.1545), military commander from Hamm

References

Dutch-language surnames
Surnames of Dutch origin
Dutch toponymic surnames